Pac Palace (Polish: Pałac Paca) - a historical building, located by Miodowa Street in Warsaw, Poland.

History

The palace was built between 1681 and 1687 in the Baroque architectural style, as commissioned by Dominik Mikołaj Radziwiłł under architect Tylman van Gameren. The palace was property of the Radziwiłł family until the first half of the nineteenth-century. In 1823 the building was sold to Ludwik Michał Pac who, following architect Enrico Marconi's designs, carried out a reconstruction of the palace into the Classicist architectural style. The palace was partially destroyed during World War II, with reconstruction works carried out between 1948 and 1951. Presently, the palace houses the headquarters of the Ministry of Health.

References

Palaces in Warsaw